Epiphloea may refer to:
 Epiphloea (alga), a genus of algae in the family Halymeniaceae
 Epiphloea (fungus), a genus of fungi in the family Heppiaceae